Dan Lancaster (born 25 May 2001) is an English rugby union player for Ealing Trailfinders in the RFU Championship. He previously played for Leicester Tigers in Premiership Rugby, the top division of rugby union in England, as well as Leeds Tykes and  Nottingham in the RFU Championship. His primary position is fly half, he also plays centre.

Career
Lancaster started playing for local club West Park in Leeds as a 7-year old. In 2018 Lancaster was named in Scotland's under 18 team, qualifying through his Dumfries-born grandmother.

On 1 January 2021, Lancaster was named in the England Under 20s Elite Player squad, one of only two players from outside Premiership Rugby.  He played all five games as England won the 2021 Six Nations Under 20s Championship.

On 15 July 2021, Lancaster signed for Leicester Tigers. He made his Leicester debut as a substitute on 14 November 2021 in a Premiership Rugby Cup win over Sale Sharks, and made his first start a week later scoring 15 points in a 55-7 Premiership Rugby Cup win over Wasps.

On 13 May Lancaster's early release was announced by Leicester, and he was announced as having joined Bond University Rugby Club in Queensland, Australia. 

ON 13 May 2022, it was confirmed that Lancaster would leave Leicester with immediate effect to join Ealing Trailfinders in the RFU Championship.

Personal life
Lancaster is the son of Stuart Lancaster, the former  head coach from 2011-2015.

References

English rugby union players
2001 births
Living people
Leeds Tykes players
Leicester Tigers players
Nottingham R.F.C. players
Rugby union fly-halves
Rugby union players from Leeds